The Edge Baronetcy, of Ribble Lodge in Lytham St Annes in the County Palatine of Lancaster, is a title in the Baronetage of the United Kingdom. It was created on 9 June 1937, for the Liberal politician Sir William Edge. He represented Bolton and Bosworth in the House of Commons.

Edge baronets, of Ribble Lodge (1937)
Sir William Edge, 1st Baronet (1880–1948)
Sir Knowles Edge, 2nd Baronet (1905–1984)
William Edge, presumed 3rd Baronet (born 1936)

The presumed third Baronet does not use his title. Also, he had not successfully proved his succession to the baronetcy, and is therefore not on the Official Roll of the Baronetage, with the baronetcy considered dormant.

Notes

Edge